Cod is the common name for fish of the genus Gadus, as well as being used to refer to several other varieties of fish.

Cod, CoD or COD may also refer to:

Books 
 A Century of Dishonor, a non-fiction book by Helen Hunt Jackson, first published in 1881
 Concise Oxford Dictionary, well known Oxford dictionary
 Cod: A Biography of the Fish That Changed the World, a 1997 book by Mark Kurlansky

Computing
 Caldera OpenDOS, a former open source distribution of DR-DOS
 Cluster on die, a feature available in certain Haswell-EP CPUs that provides support for logical CPU partitioning

Education
 College of DuPage, a community college in Illinois
 College of the Desert, a community college in California

Entertainment 
 C.O.D. (1914 film), a short comedy film
 C.O.D. (1932 film), a British crime film
 "C.O.D." (Law & Order), 325th episode of NBC's legal drama
 "C.O.D." (Person of Interest), an episode of the American TV series Person of Interest
 Call of Duty, a video game franchise

Finance and commerce
 Cancellation-of-debt income, a U.S. tax concept
 Cash on delivery or "collect on delivery", a type of financial transaction
 Certificate of deposit, a financial instrument

Music
 C.O.D. (album), by Saint Vitus, released in 1992
 C.O.D. (musician) (?–2012), American electro musician
 Cod Music, a record label
 "C.O.D.", a song by AC/DC on the album For Those About to Rock We Salute You
 C.O.D., a vinyl release by Mark Mulcahy
 Codfish, an Australian beatboxer

Science
 Catastrophic optical damage, a laser failure mode
 Cause of death, essential data on a governmental death certificate
 Chemical oxygen demand, a water quality measure
 Chitin disaccharide deacetylase, an enzyme
 Cordoba Durchmusterung, an astrometric survey
 Crystallography Open Database, a database of crystal structures
 Cyclooctadiene, a chemical compound
 1,5-Cyclooctadiene, a specific isomer of cyclooctadiene

Transport
 USS Cod, a U.S. Navy submarine
 Carrier onboard delivery, a type of military aircraft
 Yellowstone Regional Airport, IATA code COD

Other uses
 Cód, the Hungarian name for Sadu, Romania
 Cod stronghold, a World War II German stronghold in Hermanville-sur-Mer, France
 The Cods, a faction in the Hook and Cod wars
 A term for male genitalia, as in the word codpiece
 ISO 3166 code for Democratic Republic of the Congo, a country in central Africa
 City of Dreams (casino), a casino resort in Cotai, Macau, China
 Cod Latin, fake Latin
 Commercial operation date

See also
 Cape Cod (disambiguation)
 Codd, a surname